In Greek mythology, Pyrgo (Ancient Greek: Πυργώ) was the first wife of the Pisatian prince Alcathous, son of King Pelops of Pisa and Hippodamia, daughter of Oenomaus. She may be the mother of some or all of Alcathous children: Ischepolis, Callipolis, Iphinoe and Periboea. Otherwise, they were by Alcathous' second wife, Euaechme, daughter of King Megareus of Megara.

Notes

References 

 Pausanias, Description of Greece with an English Translation by W.H.S. Jones, Litt.D., and H.A. Ormerod, M.A., in 4 Volumes. Cambridge, MA, Harvard University Press; London, William Heinemann Ltd. 1918. . Online version at the Perseus Digital Library
 Pausanias, Graeciae Descriptio. 3 vols. Leipzig, Teubner. 1903.  Greek text available at the Perseus Digital Library.
 Pseudo-Apollodorus, The Library with an English Translation by Sir James George Frazer, F.B.A., F.R.S. in 2 Volumes, Cambridge, MA, Harvard University Press; London, William Heinemann Ltd. 1921. . Online version at the Perseus Digital Library. Greek text available from the same website.

Women in Greek mythology
Megarian characters in Greek mythology